The following lists events that happened during 1999 in Uganda.

Incumbents
President: Yoweri Museveni 
Vice President: Specioza Kazibwe
Prime Minister: Kintu Musoke (until April 5), Apolo Nsibambi (starting April 5)

Events

March
 A group of 14 tourists looking for mountain gorillas in Bwindi National Park are attacked and kidnapped by Interahamwe. Eight of the tourists are killed.

April
 April 20 - Uganda downplays an agreement in Libya to end the Second Congo War.

Births

 21 May – Rita Musamali, cricketer

References

 
1990s in Uganda
Years of the 20th century in Uganda
Uganda
Uganda